Kemmy Pilato (born 18 May 1989, in Tutume) is a Botswana footballer who currently plays for BMC Lobatse.

Career

Club
He left Extension Gunners on 9 July 2011 and joined League rival Botswana Meat Commission FC.

International
He won one cap for the Botswana national football team in 2009.

Notes

Living people
Botswana footballers
Botswana international footballers
Extension Gunners FC players
1989 births
Association football midfielders